Arsen Savadov is a Ukrainian conceptualist photographer and painter of Armenian descent.  Participant of the Ukrainian New Wave.

Biography 
Arsen Savadov was born in 1962 in Kiev, to the family of Vladimir Savadov, a book illustrator, originally from Baku, Azerbaijan. He studied painting at the Shevchenko State Art School. A graduate of the Kiev Art Institute, Savadov lives and works in Kyiv.

Selected personal exhibitions 
 2017 – Gulliver's dream, Art Ukraine Gallery, Kyiv, Ukraine
 2012 – Escape to Egypt, Collection gallery, Kyiv, Ukraine
 2012 – First-person, Pecherskiy Gallery (V-art gallery), Moscow
 2007 – Paintings. Daniyal Mahmood Gallery. New York
 2005 – Love Story. Galerie Orel Art Presenta, Paris
 2003 – Donbass-Chocolate. Galerie Orel Art Presenta, Paris
 2002 – Kokto. Marat Guelman Gallery, Kyiv, Ukraine
 2001 – Book of the Dead. Art Moscow Workshop, Central House of Artist, Moscow
 1998 – Deepinsider: Arsen Savadov (with Alexander Kharchenko), Soros Center for Contemporary Arts Gallery, Kyiv, Ukraine
 1995 — Arsen Savadov & Georgy Senchenko. House of Artist, Kyiv, Ukraine 
 1995 — Arsen Savadov. Chasie Post Gallery, Atlanta, USA 
 1995 —  (with Georgy Senchenko). Marat Guelman Gallery, Moscow
 1994 — Christmas Action (with Georgy Senchenko). Marat Guelman Gallery, Moscow
 1992 — The works of Savadov & Senchenko. Berman Gallery, New York, USA
 1991 — Arsen Savadov & Georgy Senchenko. Marat Guelman Gallery at Central House of Artists, Moscow

Selected group exhibitions 

 2017 — Art Riot: Post-Soviet Actionism, Saatchi Gallery, London
 2016 — Recycling Religion, WhiteBox, New York
 2015 — BALAGAN!!! Contemporary Art from the Former Soviet Union and Other Mythical Places, Curated by David Elliott, MOMENTUM, Berlin
 2014 — Volta 10, Basel
 2014 — PREMONITION: UKRAINIAN ART NOW, Saatchi Gallery, London
 2013 — Days of Ukraine in the United Kingdom, Saatchi Gallery, London
 2012 — Apocalypse and Renaissance in Chocolate House,  branch of the National Museum "Kiyv Art Gallery,"Kiyv. Curated by Oleg Kulik and  Kostyantyn Doroshenko.

Museums 
 Musée des Civilisations de l'Europe et de la Méditerranée, France
 Maison Européenne de la Photographie, Paris, France
 Musée d'art contemporain, Bordeaux, France
 Moderna Museet, Stockholm, Sweden
 Museum of Modern Art, Ljubljana, Slovenia
 The Jane Voorhees Zimmerli Art Museum, Norton and Nancy Dodge Collection, Rutgers
 University, New Brunswick, New Jersey, USA
 The Russian Museum, Saint-Petersburg, Russia
 Multimedia Art Museum, Moscow, Russia (Moscow House of Photography, Moscow, Russia)
 PinchukArtCentre, Kyiv, Ukraine
 Modern Art Museum, Kyiv, Ukraine
 Henie Onstad Kunstsenter, Oslo, Norway

Collections 
 Stephane Janssen Collection, USA
 Moderna Museet, Stockholm, Sweden
 Pierre Broche Collection, Paris-Moscow
 Collection Igor Markin, Moscow, Russia
 Pinchuk Art Center Collection, Kyiv, Ukraine
 Phillips De Pury Collection
 Bernar Loze Collection (Paris, France)
 Norton Dodge Collection (New Jersey, USA)
 Sir Elton John Collection (London)
 Natalia Ivanova Collection (Moscow, Russia)

References

Living people
1962 births
Ukrainian people of Armenian descent
Shevchenko State Art School alumni
Ukrainian photographers